Jalandhar City–Amritsar DEMU is a passenger train operated by Indian Railways. It runs between Amritsar railway station of Punjab and Jalandhar City Junction railway station of Punjab.

Route 
The train runs on Amritsar–Delhi main line.

Speed and frequency
The train runs with an average speed of 43 km/h and completes 79 km in 1 hours 50 min. The train runs daily.

Accidents 

74643/Jalandhar City–Amritsar DEMU crashed into spectators as they were standing and sitting on or near the tracks to see the burning of an effigy of demon Ravana as part of the Dussehra festival in the Joda Phatak area on the outskirts of Amritsar on October 19, 2018. The incident happened in the evening, killing at least 59 and injuring an additional 100.

References

External links 
 74643/Jalandhar City–Amritsar DEMU India Rail Info
 74642/Amritsar–Jalandhar City DEMU India Rail Info

Transport in Jalandhar
Transport in Amritsar
Railway services introduced in 2015
Rail transport in Punjab, India
Diesel–electric multiple units of India